Petr Malý (born 1 June 1984) is a retired Czech football player who spent most of his professional career with FK Dukla Prague.

Malý started out with Sparta Prague, joining Dukla in 2008 after failing to break into the A-team. In November 2012, Malý extended his contract with Dukla until the summer of 2015. Malý collapsed eight minutes into a January 2014 friendly match against Táborsko, later resulting in a decision to end his professional playing career in October 2014. He took to the field in the last home game of the 2014–15 season, making a substitute appearance in the final minute of the 5–1 home win against Teplice.

References

External links
 
 Guardian Football

Czech footballers
1984 births
Living people
Czech First League players
FK Dukla Prague players
Association football midfielders